The 2018–19 New Jersey Devils season was the 45th season for the National Hockey League franchise that was established on June 11, 1974, and 37th season since the franchise relocated from Colorado prior to the 1982–83 NHL season. The Devils were eliminated from playoff contention on March 15, 2019, despite defeating the Vancouver Canucks. After missing the playoffs, the Devils received the first overall selection in the 2019 NHL Entry Draft, which was the second time in three years for the team, and selected Jack Hughes.

Standings

Divisional standings

Conference standings

Schedule and results

Preseason
The preseason schedule was published on June 19, 2018.

Regular season
The regular season schedule was released on June 21, 2018.

Player statistics
As of April 6, 2019

Skaters

Goaltenders

Awards and honors

Awards

Transactions
The Devils have been involved in the following transactions during the 2018–19 season.

Trades

Free agents

Waivers

Signings

Draft picks

Below are the New Jersey Devils' selections at the 2018 NHL Entry Draft, which was held on June 22 and 23, 2018, at the American Airlines Center in Dallas, Texas.

Notes:
 The Calgary Flames' fifth-round pick went to the New Jersey Devils as the result of a trade on October 28, 2017, that sent Scott Wedgewood to Arizona in exchange for this pick.

References

New Jersey Devils seasons
New Jersey Devils
New Jersey Devils
New Jersey Devils
New Jersey Devils
21st century in Newark, New Jersey